Víctor Moya Martínez (born 10 June 1997), commonly known as Chuca, is a Spanish professional footballer who plays as a central midfielder for Polish club Miedź Legnica.

Club career
Born in Jacarilla, Alicante, Valencian Community, Chuca was a Villarreal CF youth graduate. He made his senior debut with the reserves on 17 April 2016, coming on as a second-half substitute in a 1–2 Segunda División B away loss against CD Eldense.

Chuca scored his first senior goal in his debut for the C-team, netting his team's second in a 3–2 home win against CD Torrevieja in the Tercera División on 28 August 2016. He made his first team – and La Liga – debut on 10 September of the following year, replacing fellow youth graduate Manu Trigueros in a 3–1 home win against Real Betis.

On 23 July 2018, Chuca was loaned to Segunda División side Elche CF for one season. The following 23 January, after being rarely used, his loan was cut short.

Honours
Miedź Legnica
I liga: 2021–22

References

External links

1997 births
Living people
People from Vega Baja del Segura
Sportspeople from the Province of Alicante
Spanish footballers
Spanish expatriate footballers
Footballers from the Valencian Community
Association football midfielders
La Liga players
Segunda División players
Segunda División B players
Tercera División players
Ekstraklasa players
I liga players
Villarreal CF C players
Villarreal CF B players
Villarreal CF players
Elche CF players
Wisła Kraków players
Miedź Legnica players
Spanish expatriate sportspeople in Poland
Expatriate footballers in Poland